American country music singer and songwriter Lee Brice has released five studio albums, nineteen singles and fourteen music videos.

Studio albums

Extended plays

Singles

Other singles

Promotional singles

Featured singles

Other charted songs

Music videos

Notes

References

Country music discographies
Discographies of American artists